Cyril Biddulph (28 January 1887 – 26 August 1918) was a Canadian stage actor who frequently performed in the United States.

Life
Cyril Biddulph was born 28 January 1887 on the British military base Curragh Camp in County Kildare, Ireland. In the 1901 United Kingdom census Biddulph is listed as a steward on the British vessel Langton Grange, which was at port at the West India Docks in London at the time of the census. Later Biddulph moved to New York City where he found employment as an actor. He appeared in numerous productions across the United States in the early 1910s, including performances on Broadway and at the National Theatre in Washington, D.C. His last appearance on stage in the United States was in the fall of 1914, months after the First World War began.

Biddulph returned to Canada and on 7 December 1915 he enlisted in the Canadian Expeditionary Force. His original unit was the 5th University Company, but on 16 September 1916 he joined Princess Patricia's Canadian Light Infantry regiment based out of eastern Ontario as a private. On 29 December 1916 he was commissioned as a lieutenant. On 26 August 1918 Biddulph was killed leading his battalion into action in Pas-de-Calais near the communes of Vis-en-Artois and Haucourt. The next day Vis-en-Artois and Haucourt were taken by the Canadians. Biddulph was buried in the Vis-en-Artois British Cemetery, Haucourt in plot VI. A. 12.

Biddulph was married to Broadway actress Cissie Sewell. In 1920, when fire broke out in the Boston hotel where she was staying, she delayed her evacuation until she rescued a photograph of her late husband, "disregard[ing] her valuable jewels, clothing and bonds". Ellis Island immigration records state that Sewell remained an unmarried widow through at least 1923.

Partial list of stage performances

 October 1914 – Evidence at Lyric Theatre in New York City. 
 October–November 1913 – The Great Adventure at Booth Theatre in New York. 
 March 1912 – The Siren at the Colonial Theatre in Boston.

 October–December 1911 – Uncle Sam at Liberty Theatre and Gaiety Theatre in New York. 
 March 1911 – The Dollar Princess at the National Theatre in Washington, D.C.

References

External links

The Maple Leaf Legacy Project: Cyril Biddulph

1887 births
1918 deaths
Canadian male stage actors
Canadian Expeditionary Force officers
Canadian military personnel killed in World War I
British emigrants to Canada
Burials at Vis-en-Artois British Cemetery, Haucourt
Princess Patricia's Canadian Light Infantry officers
Princess Patricia's Canadian Light Infantry soldiers